July 13 - Eastern Orthodox Church calendar - July 15

All fixed commemorations below are celebrated on July 27 by Old Calendar.

For July 14th, Orthodox Churches on the Old Calendar commemorate the Saints listed on July 1.

Saints
 Apostle Aquila of the Seventy (1st century), and St. Priscilla (1st century)  (see also: February 13, July 8)
 Martyr Justus, a soldier martyred in Rome (1st century)
 Saint Heraclius, Patriarch of Alexandria, first called by the term "Pope" (246)
 Martyr Heraclius, clubbed to death.
 Saint Onesimus of Magnesia, Monk and Wonderworker of Caesarea in Palestine (c. 284-305)
 Martyrs Aquila and Hilary, by stoning.
 Martyr Peter the New, Bishop of Crete.
 Venerable Ellius (Hellius) of Egypt (4th century)
 Saint Joseph the Confessor (Joseph I the Studite), Archbishop of Thessalonica (832)
 New Martyr John of Merv, Turkmenistan (early 11th century)

Pre-Schism Western saints
 Saint Felix of Como, the first Bishop of Como in Italy, he was a friend of St Ambrose (c. 390)
 Saint Idus of Leinster, baptised by St Patrick, he became Bishop of Alt-Fadha in Leinster, Ireland (5th century)
 Saint Optatian (Ottaziano), Bishop of Brescia in Italy c. 451-505 (c. 505)
 Saint Deusdedit of Canterbury, the first Englishman to become Archbishop of Canterbury, succeeding St Honorius in 655 (664)
 Saint Marcellinus (Marchelm, Marculf), Priest, of Utrecht (c. 762)
 Saint Libert of Saint-Trond, baptized and educated by St. Rumoldus, he became a Benedictine monk (783)

Post-Schism Orthodox saints
 Saint Stephen of Makhrishche, founder of Makhrishche Monastery in Vologda (1406)
 Venerable Nicodemus of Mt. Athos, spiritual writer (1809)
 Saint Longinus, Hiero-Schemamonk of Svyatogorsk Monastery (1882)

New martyrs and confessors
 New Hieromartyr Constantine Bogoyavlensky, Priest (1918)
 New Hieromartyr Nicholas Poretsky, Priest (1933)

Other commemorations
 Uncovering of the relics (1572) of Righteous Virgin Glyceria of Novgorod (1522)
 Uncovering of the relics (1993) of St. Theophilus, Fool-for-Christ, of Kiev (1853)

Icon gallery

Notes

References

Sources
 July 14/July 27. Orthodox Calendar (PRAVOSLAVIE.RU).
 July 27 / July 14. HOLY TRINITY RUSSIAN ORTHODOX CHURCH (A parish of the Patriarchate of Moscow).
 July 14. OCA - The Lives of the Saints.
 July 14. The Year of Our Salvation - Holy Transfiguration Monastery, Brookline, Massachusetts. 
 The Autonomous Orthodox Metropolia of Western Europe and the Americas (ROCOR). St. Hilarion Calendar of Saints for the year of our Lord 2004. St. Hilarion Press (Austin, TX). p. 52.
 The Fourteenth Day of the Month of July. Orthodoxy in China.
 July 14. Latin Saints of the Orthodox Patriarchate of Rome.
 The Roman Martyrology. Transl. by the Archbishop of Baltimore. Last Edition, According to the Copy Printed at Rome in 1914. Revised Edition, with the Imprimatur of His Eminence Cardinal Gibbons. Baltimore: John Murphy Company, 1916. pp. 206–207.
 Rev. Richard Stanton. A Menology of England and Wales, or, Brief Memorials of the Ancient British and English Saints Arranged According to the Calendar, Together with the Martyrs of the 16th and 17th Centuries. London: Burns & Oates, 1892. pp. 335–337.
Greek Sources
 Great Synaxaristes:  14 ΙΟΥΛΙΟΥ. ΜΕΓΑΣ ΣΥΝΑΞΑΡΙΣΤΗΣ.
  Συναξαριστής. 14 Ιουλίου. ECCLESIA.GR. (H ΕΚΚΛΗΣΙΑ ΤΗΣ ΕΛΛΑΔΟΣ). 
  14/07/2018. Ορθόδοξος Συναξαριστής. 
Russian Sources
  27 июля (14 июля). Православная Энциклопедия под редакцией Патриарха Московского и всея Руси Кирилла (электронная версия). (Orthodox Encyclopedia - Pravenc.ru).
  14 июля по старому стилю / 27 июля по новому стилю. СПЖ "Союз православных журналистов". 2018.
  14 июля (ст.ст.) 27 июля 2014 (нов. ст.). Русская Православная Церковь Отдел внешних церковных связей. (DECR).

July in the Eastern Orthodox calendar